The 1847 Connecticut gubernatorial election was held on April 5, 1847. Former state legislator and Whig nominee Clark Bissell was elected, defeating Democratic nominee Isaac Whittlesey with 50.54% of the vote.

General election

Candidates
Major party candidates

Clark Bissell, Whig
Isaac Whittlesey, Democratic

Minor party candidates

Francis Gillette, Liberty

Results

References

1847
Connecticut
Gubernatorial